Werden Abbey was a Benedictine monastery in Essen-Werden (Germany), situated on the Ruhr.

The foundation of the abbey 
Near Essen Saint Ludger founded a monastery in 799 and became its first abbot. The little church which Saint Ludger built here in honor of Saint Stephen was completed in 804 and dedicated by Saint Ludger himself, who had meanwhile become Bishop of Münster. Upon the death of Ludger on 26 March 809, the abbacy of Werden passed by inheritance first to his younger brother Hildigrim I (809–827), then successively to four of his nephews: Gerfried (827–839), Thiadgrim (ruled less than a year), Altfried (839–848), Hildigrim II (849–887). Under Hildigrim I, also Bishop of Châlons-sur-Marne, the new monastery of Helmstedt in the Diocese of Halberstadt was founded from Werden. It was ruled over by a provost, and remained a dependency of Werden till its secularization in 1803.

Werden was a wealthy abbey with possessions in Westphalia, Frisia, eastern Saxony and around the abbey itself, where it had a territory of 125 km².

On 22 May 877, under Hildigrim II, the monastery, which up to that time had been the property of the family of Saint Ludger, obtained, Imperial immediacy, which amounted to the right of free abbatical election and immunity. Henceforth the abbots of Werden were imperial princes and had a seat in the Imperial Diet. The abbey church of Werden, destroyed by fire in 1256, was rebuilt in the late-Romanesque style (1256–75). Two of the most obscure yet intriguing men to hold seats of authority in Werden Abbey (found in the Archives in North Rhine-Westphalia), were Abt Johann I., (1330–44) and Abt Johann II. von Arscheid (Arscheyt, Arschott-Brabant), (1344–60). Thereafter the monastery began to decline to such an extent that under Abbot Conrad von Gleichen (1454–74), who was a married layman, the whole community consisted of only three men, who divided the possessions of the abbey among themselves. After a complete reform, instituted in 1477, by Abbot Adam von Eschweiler of the Bursfelde Congregation, Werden continued in existence until its secularization in 1803.

Early modern times 
Problems arose after the Reformation, when the Vögte (lords protectors) of the abbey were the Protestant rulers of Brandenburg, who had inherited the neighbouring County of the Mark.

The construction of Baroque abbey buildings, textile production and coal mining formed the economic basis of the territory of Werden in the 18th century.

The end of the abbey 
During the secularization in 1803 the abbey and its territory became part of Prussia, but three years later it was incorporated into the Grand Duchy of Berg. In 1815 it became Prussian again, as part of the Rhine Province.

The buildings are now used by the Folkwang Hochschule.

References 

 

Benedictine monasteries in Germany
Monasteries in North Rhine-Westphalia
Christian monasteries established in the 9th century
Religious organizations disestablished in 1803
Imperial abbeys disestablished in 1802–03
Roman Catholic churches in Essen
Basilica churches in Germany
County of Mark